Brennivín is considered to be Iceland's signature distilled beverage. It is distilled from fermented grain mash and then combined with Iceland's very soft, high-pH water, and flavored only with caraway. A clear, savory, herbal spirit, the taste is often described as having notes of fresh rye bread. It is considered to be a type of aquavit and bottled at 40% ABV (80 proof). The steeping of herbs in alcohol to create schnapps is a long-held folk tradition in Nordic countries, and Brennivín is still the traditional drink for the mid-winter feast of Þorrablót. Today, Icelanders typically drink it chilled, as a shot, with a beer, or as a base for cocktails. It often takes the place of gin in classic cocktails, or of a lighter rum in tropical drinks.

Etymology
The word "brennivín" means "burning wine" and has the same origin as brandy, namely brandewijn, which has its origins in the Dutch language (also compare German Branntwein and Afrikaans brandewyn). A variation of the same word is used in other North Germanic languages. In Swedish the liquor is referred to as "brännvin", in Danish as "brændevin", in Norwegian as "brennevin" and in Faroese as "brennivín".

History
The history of Brennivín is tied to the history of Iceland. Iceland was settled in the late ninth century by Norwegian and Celtic people. In 1262, Icelanders became subjects of the king of Norway. In 1397, the Kalmar Union between the Nordic countries put Iceland (along with Norway, Greenland, and the Faroe Islands) under the Danish crown. Although beer could not easily survive the ocean journey, malt and honey were freely traded between Scandinavia and Iceland. Icelanders could make their own mead, and, occasionally, beer. But in 1602 the Danish King instituted a trade monopoly, the "Einokunarverslun," in Iceland. Only certain Danish merchants could trade with Iceland, and Icelanders could not trade with anyone else. Mead, beer, honey and malt took up valuable space on the ships. Spirits, however, took up less space, didn't spoil, and could be sold for a much higher price. The distillation techniques of the day (known as "burning") meant that the resulting spirits (known as "burnt wine" or "brann-vin") were often less than appealing. One way to improve the taste was to infuse the spirits with herbs. Even in the harsh climate of Iceland, caraway was available, and used to flavor the shipments of spirits from Denmark. And so, aquavit was born. The trade monopoly ended in 1786, and thirty years later modern distillation techniques made their way to Scandinavia. Of course, by then the taste for various aquavits had already been well established in all the Nordic countries. Cleaner spirits were available, but people still preferred them flavored with herbs. Although the trade monopoly was no more, the Danish Distilling Company had a monopoly on distillation in Denmark and the territories it controlled, including Iceland. Icelanders were forbidden to distill their own spirits. In 1908, a prohibition referendum was passed in Iceland. Starting in 1912 all imports of alcohol would cease. There would be no more beer, no more wine, and no more distilled spirits. Any remaining stocks of alcoholic beverages had to be consumed or destroyed by 1915. In 1918 Iceland regained its independence from Denmark. Absent prohibition, the Danish monopoly on distillation would no longer apply. In 1935, prohibition was partially repealed. Once again spirits would be allowed, but the production, distribution, and sale would be controlled by the now independent government. Beer would remain illegal until March 1, 1989. As the Icelanders were no longer captive to the Danish Distilling Company, they could make whatever they wished. The Icelandic government set up the State Alcohol Company of Iceland, known as the "AVR", which still exists today as the "ATVR". One of the few spirits the AVR decided to produce was caraway-flavored Brennivín. In contrast to the colorful French and Italian spirits labels at the time, the government of Iceland demanded a stark black and white label for the newly legal spirit. The green bottle displayed a white skull on the black label in order to warn against consumption (later replaced by the map of Iceland and a clear bottle). Therefore, it was sometimes called "svarti dauði" (black death). The intention was to be visually unappealing, and limit demand. It didn't work. For decades, Brennivín was the drink of choice for Icelanders and became a pop-culture treasure brought home by travelers. In 2014, it was finally legally imported to America. And by then, Brennivín had practically become a symbol of Iceland itself.

Serving
Brennivín is typically served cold as a shot, with a beer, or as a base for cocktails. It often takes the place of gin in classic cocktails, or of a lighter rum in tropical drinks. It is also the traditional accompaniment to the uniquely Icelandic hákarl, a type of fermented shark meat.

Branding

Various Icelandic distilleries produce different brands of brennivín, which all have their own character although loyal to the old brennivín once produced by the state-owned monopoly ÁTVR.

Availability outside Iceland
Export of Brennivín from Iceland to the United States began in early 2014. Export to Germany and Canada followed, as well as sales to Denmark and
Sweden.

In popular culture
In music:
The Foo Fighters song, "Skin and Bones" prominently mentions Brennivín, ("All worn out and nothing fits, Brennivín and cigarettes, The more I give the less I get, But I'm all set") and Dave Grohl often wears a Brennivin t-shirt.
"Brennivin" is the name of a song on the Seal Beach EP of The Album Leaf project.
A song "Brennivin" appears on the Faroese band Týr's album, Land.

In films and Television:
On the NBC show, Blindspot, there is an Icelandic character, Ice Cream, and in Season 5 Episode 6 the main characters all share a shot of Brennivin at the end of the episode.
Icelandic films such as Kristnihald undir Jökli, Land og synir, Stuttur Frakki, Djöflaeyjan, Ingaló, Cold Fever, and others have featured the drink.

In a Japanese webcomic
The character Iceland, in the Japanese webcomic Hetalia: Axis Powers, involves this drink in his song, "With Love, From Iceland".

References

See also
Akvavit
Brännvin
Moonshine — Iceland

Icelandic distilled drinks
Icelandic cuisine